Cosimo Morelli (1732 – February 26, 1812) was an Italian architect, active throughout the Papal States in a Neoclassic style.

Biography
He was born at Imola. His father, also an architect, studied under Giovanni Domenico Trifogli, who was considered to be one of the Comacini, whose works were much appreciated in northern Italy. Cosimo is said to have studied geometry under Vincenzo Savini. Boni says of that Morelli was of a vast genius, and enterprising, he advanced rapidly in his new career; firm of character, pleasant tract, witty expression, he obtained the affection and esteem of many illustrious person.

Morelli was the most prolific architect during the Pontifical States of the mid-18th century. He was knighted by Pius IX. thanks mostly to his relationship with the Roman curia and his ability to interpret and develop the tastes of his epoch. Under the tutelage of Pope Pius VII, Morelli build, renovated, and amplified numerous civic and religious buildings. His fame, beyond his talent, was partly due to employing a “team” of artisans and painters in his commissions, such as Alessandro Dalla Nave, Antonio Villa and Angelo Gottarelli, among others.

He died at Imola in 1812.

Works
Chiesa di San Prospero in Imola, finished on September 4, 1836, for Bishop  Giovanni Maria Mastai-Ferretti, who would later become Pope Pius IX, in 1846.
Palazzo Braschi in Rome, on Piazza Navona and Corso Vittorio Emanuele II, built for duke Luigi Braschi Onesti, nephew of Pius IX, which used to be a former palazzo for the Orsini family. Today it houses the Museum of Rome.
Teatro dell'Aquila in Fermo, in 1780, is renowned for its acoustics.
Teatro Lauro Rossi in Macerata, inaugurated in 1774 and still in use today.

Other works include at the Duomo of Imola, Fermo Cathedral, Fossombrone Cathedral, and  Macerata Cathedral, the church of Santo Stefano in Imola, of San Francesco in Lugo; helped rebuild the Main parish of Ravenna, and the facade of San Pietro in Bologna; also the theaters of Iesi,  Osimo, Forlì,  Ferrara, Tor di Nona in Rome, and others. He helped design the palace of Anguissola in Piacenza, Silvestri in Macerata, and the facade of Palazzo Berio on via Toledo in Naples. He designed the civic hospital of Imola, the seminary of Subiaco, and the triumphal arch erected by San Arcangelo in honor of their fellow native, Clement XIV.

Sources

1732 births
1812 deaths
People from Imola
18th-century Italian architects
19th-century Italian architects
Italian neoclassical architects
Architects from Emilia-Romagna